The 2021 Toronto Blue Jays season was the 45th season of the Toronto Blue Jays franchise.

Due to the COVID-19 pandemic and associated travel restrictions, the team played 38 games at their spring training home of TD Ballpark in Dunedin, Florida, instead of returning to their normal home of Rogers Centre in Toronto, with the hope of moving back once Canada–U.S. travel restrictions are eased. The team then began playing their home schedule at Sahlen Field in Buffalo, New York (their home in 2020) in June. On July 30, the Blue Jays returned to Rogers Centre for the first time since the 2019 season.

The Blue Jays finished the regular season with a 91–71 record, giving the team their best win percentage since 2015, but did not qualify for the postseason. The team finished in fourth place in the American League East, one game behind both the Boston Red Sox and New York Yankees, which secured the AL's two wild card spots.

Offseason
The Toronto Blue Jays signed Robbie Ray, Tyler Chatwood, Kirby Yates, George Springer, Marcus Semien, and Joe Panik. However, Yates had a season-ending Tommy John surgery shortly before the start of the regular season, the second such surgery in his life.

Regular season

Standings

American League East

American League Wild Card

Blue Jays team leaders

 Minimum 3.1 plate appearances per team games played
AVG qualified batters: Bichette, Grichuk, Guerrero Jr., Gurriel Jr., Hernández, Semien

 Minimum 1 inning pitched per team games played
ERA & WHIP qualified pitchers: Ray, Ryu

Records vs opponents

2021 draft
The 2021 Major League Baseball draft began on July 11. The draft was shortened to 20 rounds for the 2021 season due to the ongoing COVID-19 pandemic. The Blue Jays forfeited their second round selection due to signing George Springer during the offseason.

Game log

|- style="background:#bfb;"
| 1 || April 1 || @ Yankees || 3–2  || Romano (1–0) || Nelson (0–1) || Merryweather (1) || 10,850 || 1–0 || —
|- style="background:#fbb;"
| 2 || April 3 || @ Yankees || 3–5 || Loáisiga (1–0) || Stripling (0–1) || Green (1) || 10,107 || 1–1 || 1
|- style="background:#bfb;"
| 3 || April 4 || @ Yankees || 3–1 || Borucki (1–0) || Germán (0–1) || Merryweather (2) || 10,066 || 2–1 || 1
|- style="background:#bfb;"
| 4 || April 5 || @ Rangers || 6–2 || Matz (1–0) || Foltynewicz (0–1) || — || 38,258 || 3–1 || —
|- style="background:#fbb;"
| 5 || April 6 || @ Rangers || 4–7 || Dunning (1–0) || Roark (0–1) || Kennedy (1) || 18,585 || 3–2 || —
|- style="background:#fbb;"
| 6 || April 7 || @ Rangers || 1–2 || Gibson (1–0) || Ryu (0–1) || Kennedy (2) || 16,876 || 3–3 || 1
|- style="background:#fbb;"
| 7 || April 8 || Angels || 5–7  || Guerra (2–0) || Borucki (1–1) || Iglesias (2) || 1,348 || 3–4 || 1
|- style="background:#fbb;"
| 8 || April 9 || Angels || 1–7 || Heaney (1–1) || Zeuch (0–1) || — || 1,523 || 3–5 || 1½
|- style="background:#bfb;"
| 9 || April 10 || Angels || 15–1 || Matz (2–0) || Quintana (0–1) || Milone (1) || 1,292 || 4–5 || 1½
|- style="background:#bbb;"
| – || April 11 || Angels || colspan=7 | Postponed (Rain, Makeup August 10)
|- style="background:
|- style="background:#fbb;"
| 10 || April 12 || Yankees || 1–3 || Cole (2–0) || Ray (0–1) || Chapman (1) || 1,576 || 4–6 || 2½
|- style="background:#bfb;"
| 11 || April 13 || Yankees || 7–3 || Ryu (1–1) || Taillon (0–1) || — || 1,550 || 5–6 || 2½
|- style="background:#bfb;"
| 12 || April 14 || Yankees || 5–4 || Dolis (1–0) || Green (0–2) || — || 1,613 || 6–6 || 3
|- style="background:#fbb;"
| 13 || April 15 || @ Royals || 5–7 || Junis (1–0) || Kay (0–1) || Barlow (1) || 6,266 || 6–7 || 3
|- style="background:#bbb;"
| — || April 16 || @ Royals || colspan=8| Postponed (Rain, Makeup: April 17)
|- style="background:#bfb;"
| 14 || April 17  || @ Royals || 5–1  || Matz (3–0) || Minor (1–1) || — || 9,048 || 7–7 || 
|- style="background:#fbb;"
| 15 || April 17  || @ Royals || 2–3  || Holland (2–1) || Payamps (0–1) || — || 8,950 || 7–8 || 3½
|- style="background:#fbb;"
| 16 || April 18 || @ Royals || 0–2 || Zimmer (1–0) || Zeuch (0–2) || Holland (2) || 9,042 || 7–9 || 3
|- style="background:#fbb;"
| 17 || April 20 || @ Red Sox || 2–4 || Rodríguez (3–0) || Ryu (1–2) || Barnes (3) || 4,728 || 7–10 || 4½
|- style="background:#bfb;"
| 18 || April 21 || @ Red Sox || 6–3 || Borucki (2–1) || Richards (0–2) || Castro (1) || 4,661 || 8–10 || 3½
|- style="background:#bfb;"
| 19 || April 23 || @ Rays || 5–3 || Matz (4–0) || Glasnow (2–1) || Dolis (1) || 5,564 || 9–10 || 3
|- style="background:#fbb;"
| 20 || April 24 || @ Rays || 3–5 || Thompson (2–1) || Romano (1–1) || Kittredge (1) || 6,688 || 9–11 || 3
|- style="background:#bfb;"
| 21 || April 25 || @ Rays || 1–0 || Mayza (1–0) || Fleming (1–2) || Dolis (2) || 6,372 || 10–11 || 3
|- style="background:#bfb;"
| 22 || April 27 || Nationals || 9–5 || Milone (1–0) || Scherzer (1–2) || — || 1,471 || 11–11 || 3
|- style="background:#fbb;"
| 23 || April 28 || Nationals || 2–8 || Fedde (2–2) || Matz (4–1) || — || 1,274 || 11–12 || 4
|- style="background:#bfb;"
| 24 || April 30 || Braves || 13–5 || Ray (1–1) || Smyly (0–2) || — || 1,629 || 12–12 || 3½
|-

|- style="background:#bfb;"
| 25 || May 1 || Braves || 6–5  || Romano (2–1) || Jones (0–2) || — || 1,634 || 13–12 || 2½
|- style="background:#bfb;"
| 26 || May 2 || Braves || 7–2 || Borucki (3–1) || Anderson (2–1) || Dolis (3) || 1,554 || 14–12 || 1½
|- style="background:#fbb;"
| 27 || May 3 || @ Athletics || 4–5 || Montas (3–2) || Matz (4–2) || Diekman (3) || 2,944 || 14–13 || 2
|- style="background:#fbb;"
| 28 || May 4 || @ Athletics || 1–4 || Irvin (3–3) || Kay (0–2) || Petit (1) || 2,970 || 14–14 || 3
|- style="background:#bfb;"
| 29 || May 5 || @ Athletics || 9–4 || Romano (3–1) || Trivino (1–1) || — || 2,893 || 15–14 || 2
|- style="background:#bfb;"
| 30 || May 6 || @ Athletics || 10–4 || Ryu (2–2) || Fiers (0–2) || — || 3,611 || 16–14 || 2
|- style="background:#fbb;"
| 31 || May 7 || @ Astros || 4–10 || Urquidy (3–2) || Stripling (0–2) || — || 25,410 || 16–15 || 3
|- style="background:#bfb;"
| 32 || May 8 || @ Astros || 8–4 || Matz (5–2) || Javier (3–1) || — || 25,794 || 17–15 || 3
|- style="background:#fbb;"
| 33 || May 9 || @ Astros || 4–7 || Abreu (2–1) || Pearson (0–1) || Pressly (6) || 24,355 || 17–16 || 4
|- style="background:#bfb;"
| 34 || May 11 || @ Braves || 5–3 || Thornton (1–0) || Minter (1–1) || Romano (1) || 21,688 || 18–16 || 2½
|- style="background:#bfb;"
| 35 || May 12 || @ Braves || 4–1 || Ryu (3–2) || Jackson (1–1) || Cole (1) || 21,171 || 19–16 || 1½
|- style="background:#bfb;"
| 36 || May 13 || @ Braves || 8–4 || Bergen (1–0) || Smith (0–3) || — || 21,653 || 20–16 || 1½
|- style="background:#fbb;"
| 37 || May 14 || Phillies || 1–5 || Brogdon (4–1) || Thornton (1–1) || — || 1,171 || 20–17 || 2½
|- style="background:#bfb;"
| 38 || May 15 || Phillies || 4–0 || Bergen (2–0) || Nola (3–3) || — || 1,397 || 21–17 || 2½
|- style="background:#bfb;"
| 39 || May 16 || Phillies || 10–8 || Ray (2–1) || Anderson (2–4) || — || 1,107 || 22–17 || 1½
|- style="background:#bfb;"
| 40 || May 18 || Red Sox || 8–0 || Ryu (4–2) || Rodríguez (5–2) || — || 1,566 || 23–17 || ½
|- style="background:#fbb;"
| 41 || May 19 || Red Sox || 3–7 || Richards (4–2) || Stripling (0–3) || — || 1,581 || 23–18 || 1½
|- style="background:#fbb;"
| 42 || May 20 || Red Sox || 7–8 || Valdéz (2–0) || Dolis (1–1) || Barnes (10) || 1,562 || 23–19 || 2½
|- style="background:#fbb;"
| 43 || May 21 || Rays || 7–9  || Castillo (1–2) || Beasley (0–1) || — || 1,437 || 23–20 || 3½
|- style="background:#fbb;"
| 44 || May 22 || Rays || 1–3 || Kittredge (5–0) || Castro (0–1) || Castillo (8) || 1,514 || 23–21 || 4½
|- style="background:#fbb;"
| 45 || May 23 || Rays || 4–6 || Fleming (4–3) || Chatwood (0–1) || Feyereisen (1) || 1,496 || 23–22 || 4½
|- style="background:#fbb;"
| 46 || May 24 || Rays || 8–14  || Springs (4–1) || Payamps (0–2) || — || 1,641 || 23–23 || 5½
|- style="background:#bfb;"
| 47 || May 25 || @ Yankees || 6–2 || Matz (6–2) || Kluber (4–3) || — || 12,025 || 24–23 || 4½
|- style="background:#bbb;"
| — || May 26 || @ Yankees || colspan=7 | Postponed (Rain, Makeup May 27)
|- style="background:#bfb;"
| 48 || May 27  || @ Yankees || 2–0  || Manoah (1–0) || Germán (4–3) || Romano (2) || N/A || 25–23 ||
|- style="background:#fbb;"
| 49 || May 27  || @ Yankees || 3–5  || Loáisiga (4–2) || Ray (2–2) || Green (2) || 14,056 || 25–24 || 5½
|- style="background:#bfb;"
| 50 || May 28 || @ Indians || 11–2  || Ryu (5–2) || Morgan (0–1) || — || 9,198 || 26–24 || 5
|- style="background:#bbb;"
| — || May 29 || @ Indians || colspan=7 | Postponed (Rain, Makeup May 30)
|- style="background:#bfb;"
| 51 || May 30  || @ Indians || 4–1  || Stripling (1–3) || Civale (7–2) || Romano (3) || N/A || 27–24 || 5½
|- style="background:#fbb;"
| 52 || May 30  || @ Indians || 5–6  || Clase (3–2) || Chatwood (0–2) || — || 11,690 || 27–25 || 6
|-

|- style="background:#bfb;"
| 53 || June 1 || Marlins || 5–1 || Ray (3–2) || Alcántara (2–5) || — || 5,321 || 28–25 || 5½
|- style="background:#bfb;"
| 54 || June 2 || Marlins || 6–5 || Castro (1–1) || García (3–4) || — || 5,385 || 29–25 || 4½
|- style="background:#fbb;"
| 55 || June 4 || Astros || 1–13 || Greinke (6–2) || Ryu (5–3) || — || 5,510 || 29–26 || 5
|- style="background:#bfb;"
| 56 || June 5 || Astros || 6–2 || Stripling (2–3) || Urquidy (4–3) || — || 5,327 || 30–26 || 5
|- style="background:#fbb;"
| 57 || June 6 || Astros || 3–6 || García (5–3) || Matz (6–3) || Pressly (9) || 5,404 || 30–27 || 6
|- style="background:#fbb;"
| 58 || June 8 || @ White Sox || 1–6 || Crochet (2–2) || Thornton (1–2) || — || 12,761 || 30–28 || 7
|- style="background:#bfb;"
| 59 || June 9 || @ White Sox || 6–2 || Chatwood (1–2) || Bummer (0–4) || — || 14,438 || 31–28 || 6
|- style="background:#fbb;"
| 60 || June 10 || @ White Sox || 2–5 || Keuchel (5–1) || Ryu (5–4) || Hendriks (16) || 16,903 || 31-29 || 6½
|- style="background:#fbb;"
| 61 || June 11 || @ Red Sox || 5–6 || Whitlock (2–1) || Dolis (1–2) || — || 25,257 || 31–30 || 7½
|- style="background:#bfb;"
| 62 || June 12 || @ Red Sox || 7–2 || Matz (7–3) || Pivetta (6–2) || — || 24,024 || 32–30 || 7½
|- style="background:#bfb;"
| 63 || June 13 || @ Red Sox || 18–4 || Ray (4–2) || Pérez (4–4) || — || 22,595 || 33–30 || 7½
|- style="background:#fbb;"
| 64 || June 14 || @ Red Sox || 1–2 || Barnes (3–1) || Dolis (1–3) || — || 20,070 || 33–31 || 8½
|- style="background:#fbb;"
| 65 || June 15 || Yankees || 5–6 || Loáisiga (6–2) || Mayza (1–1) || Chapman (13) || 7,145 || 33–32 || 8½ 
|- style="background:#fbb;"
| 66 || June 16 || Yankees || 2–3 || Cole (8–3) || Stripling (2–4) || Chapman (14) || 7,271 || 33–33 || 8½
|- style="background:#fbb;"
| 67 || June 17 || Yankees || 4–8 || Green (1–4) || Castro (1–2) || — || 7,288 || 33–34 || 8½
|- style="background:#fbb;"
| 68 || June 18 || @ Orioles || 1–7 || Wells (2–0) || Ray (4–3) || — || 13,284 || 33–35 || 8½
|- style="background:#bfb;"
| 69 || June 19 || @ Orioles || 10–7 || Romano (4–1) || Fry (0–2) || — || 10,721 || 34–35 || 8
|- style="background:#bfb;"
| 70 || June 20 || @ Orioles || 7–4 || Ryu (6–4) || Harvey (3–9) || Chatwood (1) || 14,917 || 35–35 || 7
|- style="background:#bfb;"
| 71 || June 22 || @ Marlins || 2–1 || Mayza (2–1) || García (3–6) || Romano (4) || 6,291 || 36–35 || 7
|- style="background:#bfb;"
| 72 || June 23 || @ Marlins || 3–1 || Ray (5–3) || Rogers (7–4) || Romano (5) || 6,164 || 37–35 || 6
|- style="background:#bfb;"
| 73 || June 24 || Orioles || 9–0 || Kay (1–2) || Kremer (0–7) || — || 6,264 || 38–35 || 5½
|- style="background:#fbb;"
| 74 || June 25 || Orioles || 5–6  || Fry (1–2) || Thornton (1–3) || Sulser (2) || 7,844 || 38–36 || 6½
|- style="background:#bfb;"
| 75 || June 26 || Orioles || 12–4 || Ryu (7–4) || Akin (0–4) || — || 5,913 || 39–36 || 6½
|- style="background:#bfb;"
| 76 || June 27 || Orioles || 5–2 || Stripling (3–4) || López (2–10) || Romano (6) || 6,044 || 40–36 || 6
|- style="background:#bfb;"
| 77 || June 29 || Mariners || 9–3 || Ray (6–3) || Montero (5–3) || — || 6,736 || 41–36 || 6½
|- style="background:#fbb;"
| 78 || June 30 || Mariners || 7–9  || Graveman (2–0) || Murphy (0–1) || Steckenrider (2) || 6,632 || 41–37 || 7½
|-

|- style="background:#fbb;"
| 79 || July 1 || Mariners || 2–7 || Kikuchi (6–3) || Ryu (7–5) || Sewald (1) || 5,456 || 41–38 || 8½
|- style="background:#bfb;"
| 80 || July 2 || Rays || 11–1 || Manoah (2–0) || Patiño (1–2) || — || 10,011 || 42–38 || 8½
|- style="background:#bfb;"
| 81 || July 3 || Rays || 6–3 || Cimber (2–2) || McClanahan (3–3) || — || 9,189 || 43–38 || 7½
|- style="background:#fbb;"
| 82 || July 4 || Rays || 1–5 || Yarbrough (5–3) || Ray (6–4) || — || 7,537 || 43–39 || 8½
|- style="background:#fbb;"
| 83 || July 6 || @ Orioles || 5–7 || Watkins (1–0) || Matz (7–4) || — || 7,388 || 43–40 || 9
|- style="background:#bfb;"
| 84 || July 7 || @ Orioles || 10–2 || Ryu (8–5) || Harvey (3–10) || — || 7,457 || 44–40 || 8
|- style="background:#bbb;"
| — || July 8 || @ Orioles || colspan=7 | Postponed (Rain, Makeup September 11)
|- style="background:#fbb;"
| 85 || July 9 || @ Rays || 1–7 || Kittredge (6–1) || Manoah (2–1) || — || 8,551 || 44–41 || 9
|- style="background:#fbb;"
| 86 || July 10 || @ Rays || 2–5 || Yarbrough (6–3) || Stripling (3–5) || Castillo (13) || 9,954 || 44–42 || 9 
|- style="background:#bfb;"
| 87 || July 11 || @ Rays || 3–1 || Ray (7–4) || Hill (6–4) || Romano (7) || 11,233 || 45–42 || 8
|- style="background:#bfb;"
| 88 || July 16 || Rangers || 10–2 || Ray (8–4) || Lyles (5–6) || — || 10,100 || 46–42 || 8
|- style="background:#bbb;"
| — || July 17 || Rangers || colspan=7 | Postponed (Rain, Makeup July 18)
|- style="background:#bfb;"
| 89 || July 18  || Rangers || 5–0  || Ryu (9–5) || Allard (2–7) || — || N/A || 47–42 || 7
|- style="background:#bfb;"
| 90 || July 18  || Rangers || 10–0  || Matz (8–4) || Foltynewicz (2–9) || — || 12,335 || 48–42 || 6
|- style="background:#fbb;"
| 91 || July 19 || Red Sox || 4–13 || Pivetta (8–4) || Stripling (3–6) || — || 12,811 || 48–43 || 7
|- style="background:#bbb;"
| — || July 20 || Red Sox || colspan=7 | Postponed (Rain, Makeup August 7)
|- style="background:#fbb;"
| 92 || July 21 || Red Sox || 4–7 || Richards (6–5) || Ray (8–5) || Barnes (20) || 14,607 || 48–44 || 8
|- style="background:#fbb;"
| 93 || July 23 || @ Mets || 0–3 || Megill (1–0) || Matz (8–5) || Díaz (20) || 28,126 || 48–45 || 9½
|- style="background:#bfb;"
| 94 || July 24 || @ Mets || 10–3 || Richards (4–0) || Walker (7–4) || — || 29,269 || 49–45 || 8½
|- style="background:#fbb;"
| 95 || July 25 || @ Mets || 4–5 || Lugo (3–1) || Barnes (1–2) || Díaz (21) || 23,675 || 49–46 || 9½
|- style="background:#fbb;"
| 96 || July 26 || @ Red Sox || 4–5 || Ottavino (3–3) || Richards (4–1) || Barnes (22) || 27,142 || 49–47 || 10½
|- style="background:#bbb;"
| — || July 27 || @ Red Sox || colspan=7 | Postponed (Rain, Makeup July 28)
|- style="background:#bfb;"
| 97 || July 28  || @ Red Sox || 4–1  || Ray (9–5) || Richards (6–6) || Romano (8) || 27,410 || 50–47 || 9½
|- style="background:#fbb;"
| 98 || July 28  || @ Red Sox || 1–4  || Whitlock (4–1) || Matz (8–6) || Barnes (23) || 27,783 || 50–48 || 10½
|- style="background:#bfb;"
| 99 || July 29 || @ Red Sox || 13–1 || Ryu (10–5) || Rodríguez (7–6) || — || 33,191 || 51–48 || 9½
|- style="background:#bfb;"
| 100 || July 30 || Royals || 6–4 || Stripling (4–6) || Lynch (1–3) || Romano (9) || 13,446 || 52–48 || 8½
|- style="background:#bfb;"
| 101 || July 31 || Royals || 4–0 || Manoah (3–1) || Minor (8–9) || — || 13,953 || 53–48 || 8
|-

|- style="background:#bfb;"
| 102 || August 1 || Royals || 5–1 || Berríos (8–5) || Keller (7–10) || — || 14,427 || 54–48 || 8
|- style="background:#fbb;"
| 103 || August 2 || Indians || 2–5  || Shaw (4–5) || Hand (5–6) || Clase (14) || 14,653 || 54–49 || 8
|- style="background:#bfb;"
| 104 || August 3 || Indians || 7–2 || Ryu (11–5) || Plesac (6–4) || — || 14,270 || 55–49 || 7
|- style="background:#bfb;"
| 105 || August 4 || Indians || 8–6 || Matz (9–6) || Mejía (1–7) || — || 14,410 || 56–49 || 7
|- style="background:#bfb;"
| 106 || August 5 || Indians || 3–0 || Stripling (5–6) || McKenzie (1–5) || Cimber (1) || 14,289 || 57–49 || 6½
|- style="background:#bfb;"
| 107 || August 6 || Red Sox || 12–4 || Manoah (4–1) || Eovaldi (9–7) || — || 14,719 || 58–49 || 6½
|- style="background:#bfb;"
| 108 || August 7  || Red Sox || 1–0  || Romano (5–1) || Barnes (5–3) || — || 14,768 || 59–49 || 6
|- style="background:#fbb;"
| 109 || August 7  || Red Sox || 1–2  || Barnes (6–3) || Cimber (2–3) || Ottavino (8) || 12,659 || 59–50 || 7
|- style="background:#bfb;" 
| 110 || August 8 || Red Sox || 9–8 || Dolis (2–3) || Barnes (6–4) || Romano (10) || 14,766 || 60–50 || 7
|- style="background:#fbb;"
| 111 || August 10  || Angels || 3–6 || Guerra (3–2) || Matz (9–7) || Iglesias (25) || 3,656 || 60–51 || 7½
|- style="background:#bfb;"
| 112 || August 10  || @ Angels || 4–0 || Richards (5–1) || Suárez (5–5) || — || 14,443 || 61–51 || 7½
|- style="background:#bfb;" 
| 113 || August 11 || @ Angels || 10–2 || Manoah (5–1) || Bundy (2–9) || — || 22,620 || 62–51 || 6½
|- style="background:#fbb;" 
| 114 || August 12 || @ Angels || 3–6 || Ohtani (7–1) || Berríos (8–6) || — || 19,590 || 62–52 || 7½
|- style="background:#fbb;" 
| 115 || August 13 || @ Mariners || 2–3 || Steckenrider (5–2) || Cimber (2–4) || — || 28,207 || 62–53 || 8½
|- style="background:#fbb;" 
| 116 || August 14 || @ Mariners || 3–9 || Middleton (1–2) || Ryu (11–6) || — || 26,090 || 62–54 || 8½
|- style="background:#bfb;" 
| 117 || August 15 || @ Mariners || 8–3 || Matz (10–7) || Gilbert (5–4) || — || 22,679 || 63–54 || 7½
|- style="background:#fbb;" 
| 118 || August 17 || @ Nationals || 6–12 || Fedde (5–8) || Manoah (5–2) || — || 20,060 || 63–55 || 9
|- style="background:#fbb;"
| 119 || August 18 || @ Nationals || 5–8 || Thompson (1–1) || Hand (5–7) || Finnegan (4) || 18,336 || 63–56 || 10
|- style="background:#fbb;" 
| 120 || August 20 || Tigers || 1–4  || Soto (5–3) || Richards (5–2) || — || 14,649 || 63–57 || 10½
|- style="background:#bfb;" 
| 121 || August 21 || Tigers || 3–0 || Ryu (12–6) || Peralta (3–3) || Romano (11) || 14,887 || 64–57 || 10½
|- style="background:#fbb;" 
| 122 || August 22 || Tigers || 3–5  || Soto (6–3) || Snead (0–1) || Jiménez (1) || 14,865 || 64–58 || 11½
|- style="background:#bfb;"
| 123 || August 23 || White Sox || 2–1 || Mayza (3–1) || Kimbrel (2–4) || Romano (12) || 14,640 || 65–58 || 11
|- style="background:#fbb;" 
| 124 || August 24 || White Sox || 2–5 || Cease (10–6) || Berríos (8–7) || Hendriks (29) || 14,553 || 65–59 || 12
|- style="background:#bfb;" 
| 125 || August 25 || White Sox || 3–1 || Mayza (4–1) || Bummer (2–5) || Romano (13) || 14,276 || 66–59 || 12
|- style="background:#fbb;" 
| 126 || August 26 || White Sox || 7–10 || Rodón (10–5) || Ryu (12–7) || Kimbrel (24) || 14,958 || 66–60 || 12½
|- style="background:#fbb;" 
| 127 || August 27 || @ Tigers || 1–2 || Cisnero (3–4) || Mayza (4–2) || Soto (16) || 17,259 || 66–61 || 13½
|- style="background:#bfb;"
| 128 || August 28 || @ Tigers || 3–2  || Romano (6–1) || Funkhouser (6–2) || — || 18,783 || 67–61 || 13½
|- style="background:#bfb;" 
| 129 || August 29 || @ Tigers || 2–1 || Berríos (9–7) || Boyd (3–7) || Mayza (1) || 15,956 || 68–61 || 13½
|- style="background:#bfb;" 
| 130 || August 30 || Orioles || 7–3 || Ray (10–5) || Tate (0–4) || Romano (14) || 14,406 || 69–61 || 13½
|- style="background:#fbb;" 
| 131 || August 31 || Orioles || 2–4 || Akin (2–8) || Ryu (12–8) || Sulser (6) || 13,963 || 69–62 || 14½
|-

|- style="background:#bfb;" 
| 132 || September 1 || Orioles || 5–4 || Mayza (5–2) || Tate (0–5) || Romano (15) || 14,262 || 70–62 || 13½
|- style="background:#bfb;" 
| 133 || September 3 || Athletics || 11–10 || Romano (7–1) || Romo (1–1) || — || 14,843 || 71–62 || 13
|- style="background:#bfb;" 
| 134 || September 4 || Athletics || 10–8 || Berríos (10–7) || Blackburn (0–2) || — || 14,947 || 72–62 || 13
|- style="background:#bfb;" 
| 135 || September 5 || Athletics || 8–0 || Ray (11–5) || Irvin (9–13) || — || 14,988 || 73–62 || 12
|- style="background:#bfb;" 
| 136 || September 6 || @ Yankees || 8–0 || Ryu (13–8) || Taillon (8–6) || — || 31,196 || 74–62 || 12
|- style="background:#bfb;" 
| 137 || September 7 || @ Yankees || 5–1 || Matz (11–8) || Cole (14–7) || — || 30,164 || 75–62 || 12
|- style="background:#bfb;" 
| 138 || September 8 || @ Yankees || 6–3 || Richards (6–2) || Holmes (6–3) || Romano (16) || 25,873 || 76–62 || 11
|- style="background:#bfb;" 
| 139 || September 9 || @ Yankees || 6–4 || Berríos (11–7) || Romano (0–2) || — || 30,112 || 77–62 || 10½
|- style="background:#fbb;" 
| 140 || September 10 || @ Orioles || 3–6 || Greene (1–0) || Merryweather (0–1) || Sulser (7) || 11,751 || 77–63 || 10½
|- style="background:#bfb;" 
| 141 || September 11  || @ Orioles || 11–10  || Pearson (1–1) || Wells (2–2) || Romano (17) || N/A || 78–63 || 10
|- style="background:#bfb;" 
| 142 || September 11  || @ Orioles || 11–2  || Richards (7–2) || Akin (2–9) || — || 10,219 || 79–63 || 10
|- style="background:#bfb;"
| 143 || September 12 || @ Orioles || 22–7 || Matz (12–7) || Lowther (0–2) || — || 8,474 || 80–63 || 9
|- style="background:#bfb;" 
| 144 || September 13 || Rays || 8–1 || Manoah (6–2) || Yarbrough (8–5) || — || 12,119 || 81–63 || 8
|- style="background:#fbb;" 
| 145 || September 14 || Rays || 0–2 || Rasmussen (3–1) || Berríos (11–8) || Kittredge (7) || 13,103 || 81–64 || 9
|- style="background:#bfb;"
| 146 || September 15 || Rays || 6–3 || Ray (12–5) || Wacha (3–5) || Romano (18) || 12,153 || 82–64 || 8
|- style="background:#fbb;" 
| 147 || September 17 || Twins || 3–7 || Pineda (7–8) || Ryu (13–9) || — || 14,798 || 82–65 || 9½
|- style="background:#bfb;" 
| 148 || September 18 || Twins || 6–2 || Matz (13–7) || Ober (2–3) || — || 14,722 || 83–65 || 8½
|- style="background:#bfb;" 
| 149 || September 19 || Twins || 5–3 || Berríos (12–8) || Farrell (1–1) || Romano (19) || 14,601 || 84–65 || 7½
|- style="background:#fbb;" 
| 150 || September 20 || @ Rays || 4–6 || Baz (1–0) || Ray (12–6) || Enns (2) || 10,119 || 84–66 || 8½
|- style="background:#bfb;" 
| 151 || September 21 || @ Rays || 4–2 || Manoah (7–2) || Anderson (0–1) || Romano (20) || 9,888 || 85–66 || 7½
|- style="background:#fbb;" 
| 152 || September 22 || @ Rays || 1–7 || Chargois (6–1) || Stripling (5–7) || — || 10,994 || 85–67 || 8½
|- style="background:#fbb;" 
| 153 || September 23 || @ Twins || 2–7 || Pineda (8–8) || Hatch (0–1) || Garza Jr. (1) || 15,509 || 85–68 || 9
|- style="background:#fbb;" 
| 154 || September 24 || @ Twins || 1–3 || Ober (3–3) || Berríos (12–9) || Colomé (16) || 18,861 || 85–69 || 10
|- style="background:#bfb;" 
| 155 || September 25 || @ Twins || 6–1 || Ray (13–6) || Gant (5–10) || — || 27,183 || 86–69 || 10
|- style="background:#bfb;" 
| 156 || September 26 || @ Twins || 5–2 || Manoah (8–2) || Jax (3–5) || Romano (21) || 20,676 || 87–69 || 10
|- style="background:#fbb;" 
| 157 || September 28 || Yankees || 2–7 || King (1–4) || Ryu (13–10) || — || 28,769 || 87–70 || 10
|- style="background:#bfb;" 
| 158 || September 29 || Yankees || 6–5 || Cimber (3–4) || Holmes (8–4) || Romano (22) || 29,601 || 88–70 || 10
|- style="background:#fbb;" 
| 159 || September 30 || Yankees || 2–6 || King (2–4) || Ray (13–7) || — || 29,659 || 88–71 || 10
|-

|- style="background:#bfb;" 
| 160 || October 1 || Orioles || 6–4 || Matz (14–7) || Eshelman (0–3) || Romano (23) || 28,855 || 89–71 || 10
|- style="background:#bfb;" 
| 161 || October 2 || Orioles || 10–1 || Manoah (9–2) || Means (6–9) || — || 29,916 || 90–71 || 10
|- style="background:#bfb;" 
| 162 || October 3 || Orioles || 12–4 || Ryu (14–10) || Zimmermann (4–5) || — || 29,942 || 91–71 || 9
|-

Statistics

Batting
Note: G = Games played; AB = At bats; R = Runs scored; H = Hits; 2B = Doubles; 3B = Triples; HR = Home runs; RBI = Runs batted in; SB = Stolen bases; BB = Walks; AVG = Batting average; Ref. = Reference

Pitching
Note: G = Games pitched; GS = Games started; W = Wins; L = Losses; SV = Saves; ERA = Earned run average; WHIP = Walks plus hits per inning pitched; IP = Innings pitched; H = Hits allowed; R = Total runs allowed; ER = Earned runs allowed;  BB = Walks allowed; K = Strikeouts; Ref. = Reference

Achievements 

 In their 11–1 victory over the Tampa Bay Rays on July 2, Alek Manoah set a new franchise record for most consecutive strikeouts with 7.
Three Blue Jays (Vladimir Guerrero Jr., Marcus Semien, and Teoscar Hernández) were named as starters in the 2021 MLB All-Star game, the most since 1993.
 In their 22–7 victory over the Baltimore Orioles on September 12, Lourdes Gurriel Jr. set a new franchise record for most grand slams in a season with 4.
They tied the all-time record and became only the ninth team ever (including two past Blue Jays teams) to have 7 players reach 20 home runs for the season (Vladimir Guerrero Jr. – 48, Marcus Semien – 46, Teoscar Hernández – 32, Bo Bichette – 29, Randal Grichuk – 22, George Springer – 22, and Lourdes Gurriel Jr. – 21).
Marcus Semien set a new all-time season home run record for a 2nd baseman (46).

Roster

Farm system

Notes

References

Toronto Blue Jays seasons
Toronto Blue Jays
Toronto Blue Jays
Toronto Blue Jays
Toronto Blue Jays
Toronto Blue Jays